is a Japanese footballer currently playing as a defender for Kochi United SC. For the 2023 season he joined Vanraure Hachinohe.

Career
Inazumi begin first youth career with Takikawa Daini HS as High School team and University team, Nippon Sport Science University until he was graduation in 2019.

Inazumi begin first career with J3 club, Fujieda MYFC in 2020. He leave from the club in 2021 after two years at Fujieda.

Inazumi transferred to JFL club, Kochi United SC on 20 January 2022. He leave from the club after end of the 2022 season.

On 17 December 2022, Inazumi joined to J3 club, Vanraure Hachinohe for upcoming 2023 season.

Career statistics

Club
.

Notes

References

External links

1997 births
Living people
Japanese footballers
Association football defenders
Nippon Sport Science University alumni
J3 League players
 Japan Football League players
Fujieda MYFC players
Vanraure Hachinohe players
Kochi United SC players